Robert Stainton (born 1964) is a Canadian philosopher/linguist and Distinguished University Professor at the University of Western Ontario. He is known for his works on the philosophy of language, cognitive science/philosophy of the mind, analytic metaphysics/philosophical logic, semantics and pragmatics. He is currently leading a Social Sciences and Humanities Research Council of Canada (SSHRC) Insight Grant-funded project on The Metaphysics and Epistemology of Languages with Christopher Viger. He is also “a fanatical carp fisher,” as he told Outdoor Canada.

Selected publications
Words and Thoughts. Oxford University Press, Oxford: 2006. [248 pp.] (Paperback edition, with corrections: 2009.)
Knowledge and Mind. (With J. Andrew Brook). The MIT Press, Cambridge, MA: 2000. [253 pp.] (Paperback edition: 2001.)
Philosophical Perspectives on Language. Broadview Press, Peterborough, ON: 1996. [239 pp.]
Discourse, Structure and Linguistic Choice: The Theory and Applications of Molecular Sememics by T. Price Caldwell. (Co-edited with Oliver Cresswell) Springer, Dordrecht: 2018. [134 pp.]
Sourcebook in the History of Philosophy of Language: Primary Source Texts from the Pre-Socratics to Mill. (Co-edited with Margaret Cameron and Benjamin Hill). Springer, Dordrecht: 2017. [1102 pp.]
Linguistic Content: New Essays on the History of Philosophy of Language. (Co-edited with Margaret Cameron). Oxford University Press, Oxford: 2015. [288 pp.]
Michael Gregory’s Proposals for a Communication Linguistics. (Co-edited with Jessica de Villiers). Editions du GREF, Toronto: 2009. [340 pp.]
Compositionality, Context and Semantic Values: Essays in Honour of Ernie Lepore. (Co-edited with Christopher Viger) Springer, Dordrecht: 2009. [281 pp.]
The Achilles of Rationalist Psychology. (Co-edited with Thomas M. Lennon). Springer, Dordrecht: 2008. [289 pp.]
Ellipsis and Non-Sentential Speech. (Co-edited with Reinaldo Elugardo) Springer, Dordrecht: 2005. [262 pp.]

References

External links
Personal Website
"Annals of Bipolar Recovery" Blog

Living people
Linguists from the United States
1964 births
Academic staff of Carleton University
Philosophers of language
Philosophers of linguistics
21st-century American philosophers
Academic staff of the University of Western Ontario
Glendon College alumni